Guido Hernán Pizarro Demestri (born 26 February 1990) is an Argentine professional footballer who plays as a defensive midfielder for Liga MX club Tigres UANL.

He is nicknamed "Conde" (Spanish for Count), and is a naturalized Mexican citizen.

Club career
Pizarro made his professional debut in his native Argentina with Lanús in 2009. In July 2013, he was transferred to Mexican club Tigres UANL. With Tigres, he lost the finals of the Mexico Apertura 2014 season and of the 2015 Copa Libertadores. A key player in Tigres, his team won the Mexican Apertura 2015 and Apertura 2016 championships.

In July 2017, he was transferred to Spanish club Sevilla FC. He spent a year with the club and made 40 appearances across all competitions, including 24 in La Liga.

On 7 June 2018, Pizarro rejoined Tigres UANL in a deal reported to be worth around €8.4 million.

International career
In 2016 Pizarro was named in the preliminary Argentina squad for Copa América Centenario, but was not included in the final squad. He was called up once again in November to play against Brazil and Colombia but did not see any action.
Pizarro made his official debut starting against Bolivia at La Paz on 28 March 2017.

In May 2018 he was named in Argentina's preliminary 35 man squad for the 2018 World Cup in  Russia  but did not make the final 23.

Career statistics

Honours
Tigres UANL
Liga MX: Apertura 2015, Apertura 2016, Clausura 2019
Copa MX: Clausura 2014
Campeón de Campeones: 2016, 2018
CONCACAF Champions League: 2020
Campeones Cup: 2018

Individual
Liga MX Best XI: 2015 Apertura, 2016 Apertura
CONCACAF Champions League Team of the Tournament: 2020
Liga MX All-Star: 2021, 2022

References

External links

Living people
1990 births
Footballers from Buenos Aires
Association football midfielders
Argentine footballers
Mexican footballers
Club Atlético Lanús footballers
Tigres UANL footballers
Sevilla FC players
Argentine Primera División players
Liga MX players
La Liga players
Argentine expatriate footballers
Argentina international footballers
Expatriate footballers in Spain
Argentine emigrants to Mexico
Naturalized citizens of Mexico
2019 Copa América players